SpareBank 1 Nøtterøy-Tønsberg is a Norwegian savings bank, headquartered in Nøtterøy, Norway. The banks
main market is Vestfold. The history of the bank goes back to 20 June 1857 with the establishment of the first
savings bank in Nøtterøy.

References

Banks of Norway
SpareBank 1
Companies based in Vestfold
Banks established in 1857
Companies listed on the Oslo Stock Exchange
Norwegian companies established in 1857